Rear Admiral John Matthew Leonard Kingwell  (born 26 August 1966) is a senior Royal Navy officer. He was Commandant of the Royal College of Defence Studies from 2019 to 2020.

Naval career
Kingwell joined the Royal Navy in 1984. He served as commanding officer successively of the patrol boat HMS Pursuer, the frigate HMS Argyll and the amphibious transport dock HMS Albion. He went on to be Commander United Kingdom Task Group in January 2011 and in that role commanded the task group off Libya. After that he became Head of Naval Resources and Plans in November 2011, Director of the Development, Concepts and Doctrine Centre in October 2013 and Deputy Commandant of the Royal College of Defence Studies in May 2016 before becoming Commandant of the Royal College of Defence Studies in July 2019. He handed over the post to George Norton on 21 July 2020.

Kingwell was appointed Commander of the Order of the British Empire in the 2016 Birthday Honours.

References

Royal Navy rear admirals
Commanders of the Order of the British Empire
1966 births
Living people